Union is a city in Montgomery and Miami Counties in the U.S. state of Ohio. The population was 6,419 at the time of the 2010 census. It is part of the Dayton Metropolitan Statistical Area.

Geography
The coordinates for The City of Union are  (39.900154, -84.313494).

The Stillwater River runs on its east side.

Ironically, Union lies west of West Union, Ohio, the county seat of Adams County approximately 60 miles east of Cincinnati. Union and West Union are not adjacent to each other, actually being approximately 120 miles from each other.

Transportation
One major state highway, State Route 48, runs North and South through Union. In Union, State Route 48 is known as Main Street. Union is 4 miles North of Interstate 70

Other notable streets in Union include Martindale Road, Sweet Potato Ridge Road, and Phillipsburg-Union Road.

Government
Union is a charter city and has a mayor/council/manager form of government. The current mayor is Michael O'Callaghan, and John P. Applegate is Union's city manager.

Demographics

2010 census
As of the census of 2010, there were 6,419 people, 2,554 households, and 1,811 families living in the city. The racial makeup of the city was 93.5% White, 3.6% African American, 0.2% Native American, 0.7% Asian, 0.2% from other races, and 1.8% from two or more races. Hispanic or Latino of any race were 1.6% of the population.

There were 2,554 households, of which 35.0% had children under the age of 18 living with them, 54.9% were married couples living together, 12.0% had a female householder with no husband present, 4.0% had a male householder with no wife present, and 29.1% were non-families. 24.3% of all households were made up of individuals, and 9.2% had someone living alone who was 65 years of age or older. The average household size was 2.51 and the average family size was 2.99.

The median age in the city was 38.6 years. 25.5% of residents were under the age of 18; 6.8% were between the ages of 18 and 24; 26.8% were from 25 to 44; 28.1% were from 45 to 64; and 12.8% were 65 years of age or older. The gender makeup of the city was 48.1% male and 51.9% female.

2000 census
As of the census of 2000, there were 5,574 people, 2,080 households, and 1,609 families living in the city. The population density was 1,302.0 people per square mile (502.8/km). There were 2,167 housing units at an average density of 506.2 per square mile (195.5/km). The racial makeup of the city was 96.88% White, 0.91% African American, 0.14% Native American, 0.36% Asian, 0.02% Pacific Islander, 0.36% from other races, and 1.33% from two or more races. Hispanic or Latino of any race were 1.18% of the population.

There were 2,080 households, out of which 40.1% had children under the age of 18 living with them, 61.1% were married couples living together, 11.8% had a female householder with no husband present, and 22.6% were non-families. 18.9% of all households were made up of individuals, and 5.6% had someone living alone who was 65 years of age or older. The average household size was 2.68 and the average family size was 3.05.

In the city the population was spread out, with 28.7% under the age of 18, 7.6% from 18 to 24, 33.2% from 25 to 44, 22.6% from 45 to 64, and 7.9% who were 65 years of age or older. The median age was 34 years. For every 100 females, there were 92.9 males. For every 100 females age 18 and over, there were 91.6 males.

The median income for a household in the city was $50,471, and the median income for a family was $55,139. Males had a median income of $39,944 versus $25,430 for females. The per capita income for the city was $21,260. About 2.5% of families and 3.7% of the population were below the poverty line, including 3.5% of those under age 18 and 3.5% of those age 65 or over.

Education
Union residents west of the Stillwater River are served by the Northmont City School District of Montgomery County. The schools that Union children attend include:
 Northmont High School
 Northmont Middle School
 Union Elementary
East of the Stillwater River, students attend Vandalia-Butler City School District.

Notable people 

 Bernie Babcock, author
 Wilma Leona Jackson, third director of the United States Navy Nurse Corps
 John McDougal, politician in California

References

External links
 Official site 

Cities in Miami County, Ohio
Cities in Montgomery County, Ohio
Populated places established in 1806
1806 establishments in Ohio
Cities in Ohio